The Carmel Development Company Building is a one-story concrete block commercial building in downtown Carmel-by-the-Sea, California. The building is the first and oldest commercial business block, and first "fireproof" concrete block building in Carmel. The structure is recognized as an important commercial building in the city's Downtown Conservation District Historic Property Survey, and was nominated and submitted to the California Register of Historical Resources on February 17, 2003. The building is occupied by the Carmel Drug Store, which is the oldest remaining business in the block.

History

The Carmel Development Company Building was the first "modern" commercial building in Carmel built in 1902–1903 on the northwest corner of San Carlos Street and Ocean Avenue. It has a flat roof and its exterior wall covering is made up of hollow core "fireproof" concrete blocks. The concrete wall cladding for the building was made by the Wizard Face Down Concrete Block Machine made by the Sears and Roebuck Company. T. A. Work was responsible for the construction. Artie Bowen was the Carmel carpenter and the work was supervised by George Quentel.

The building originally housed the Carmel Development Company (on left) of Frank Powers and Franklin Devendorf, the T. A. Work Hardware Company (in the middle), and Devendorf's Preble Grocery store around 1906 (on the right). The grocery store continued in business until 1973, beginning as Preble Grocery (1906), then Leidig Brothers (1916), and Kip's (1937-1973).

The Hardware store housed three different hardware stores including Holman's Carmel Hardware Store. The Carmel Development Company was replaced with the Carme Drug Store, which is the oldest drug store in Carmel. The store has operated since 1908 and still exits today with its historic interior.

Changes in the original building were made in 1989, include three fixed display windows cut into the east side and the replacement of the veneering of the storefront with black marble panels on the Carmel Drug Store, cobblestone in the middle bay, and wood paneling on the then Dansk storefront. The Carmel Drug Store has the oldest example of exterior electric lighting in Carmel.

Across the street was Stanford's Drug Store on the southeast corner of Ocean Avenue and San Carolos Street. It opened in 1908 as Carmel-by-the-Sea Drug Store, and the name changed to Stanford's Drug Store from 1929-1953. The building was torn down around 1937 and today, it is Lamb's Country Store.

The building qualifies for inclusion in the downtown historic district property survey because of its age, association with the founders of Carmel, and its importance to the economic development of Carmel. It also qualifies due to its unusual method of construction using "fireproof" concrete blocks.

On July 15, 1923, the Bank of Carmel opened in a building on Ocean Avenue, between Mission and Dolores Streets, which adjoins the Carmel Development Company building. It was the first commercial bank in Carmel. T. A. Work was elected president of the bank.

Gallery

See also
 Concrete masonry unit
 Rusticated concrete block
 Carmel Development Company

References

External links

 Downtown Conservation District Historic Property Survey
 Carmel Drug Store

1902 establishments in California
Carmel-by-the-Sea, California
Buildings and structures in Monterey County, California